Jagtar is a given name. Notable people with the name include:

Jagtar Singh Hawara (born 1973), Indian Sikh militant
Jagtar Singh (born 1990), Indian footballer
Jagtar (poet) (1935–2010), Punjabi poet
 Jagtar Singh Johal, detained activist
 Jagtar Singh Shergill, Canadian political candidate

See also 
Jagtap